Frederick William Robert Stewart, 4th Marquess of Londonderry  (1805–1872), styled Viscount Castlereagh from 1822 to 1854, was a British nobleman and Tory politician. He was briefly Vice-Chamberlain of the Household under Sir Robert Peel between December 1834 and April 1835.

Background and education 
Frederick Stewart was born on 7 July 1805 at Grosvenor Square, Mayfair, London. He was the only child of Charles Stewart and his first wife Catherine Bligh. His father would become the 3rd Marquess of Londonderry but was at the time only the second son of Robert Stewart, 1st Marquess of Londonderry. His father's family was Ulster-Scots. Frederick's mother was the fourth and youngest daughter of John Bligh, 3rd Earl of Darnley.

He was his father's only son from his father's first marriage. In 1812, while Frederick's father was serving in the army in the Peninsular War, Frederick's mother died. Frederick was seven. His father remarried seven years later in 1819 and Frederick's half-siblings were born.

He was the only child of his parents but had younger half-siblings:

Frederick was looked after by his uncle and aunt, Lord and Lady Castlereagh. He went to Eton in 1814, where he stayed until 1820. After his father succeeded to the marquessate of Londonderry in 1822, Frederick Stewart became known by the courtesy title Viscount Castlereagh, which was to be his title for 32 years until 1854. He matriculated at Christ Church, Oxford in 1823.

Political career 
He served under the Duke of Wellington as a Lord of the Admiralty from 1828 to 1830 and under Sir Robert Peel as Vice-Chamberlain of the Household from December 1834 to April 1835. On 23 February 1835, he was sworn of the Privy Council of the United Kingdom.

He was one of the Members of Parliament for County Down from 1826 until 1852.

From 1845 until 1864 he was Lord Lieutenant of Down. In 1856 he was made a Knight of the Order of St Patrick.

Personal life 
In 1838, Count Gérard de Melcy, the husband of the Italian operatic singer Giulia Grisi, discovered a letter written to Giulia by Frederick Stewart, and the two men fought a duel on 16 June of that year. Lord Castlereagh was wounded in the wrist; the Count was uninjured. After the duel, Grisi left her husband and began an affair with Lord Castlereagh. Their son, George Frederick Ormsby (1838–1901), was born in November 1838 and brought up by his father.

By 1852, he "had fallen out with his father, the 3rd Marquess of Londonderry over their views on the land question [and] was obliged to retire because of these differences".

Frederick Stewart married Lady Elizabeth Frances Charlotte Jocelyn, widow of Viscount Powerscourt and daughter of Robert Jocelyn, 3rd Earl of Roden, at the British Embassy in Paris on 2 May 1846. There were no children from the marriage. In 1855 his wife converted to Roman Catholicism.

He succeeded his father in 1854 as the 4th Marquess of Londonderry. He built Scrabo Tower as a monument to the memory of his father. In 1857 he and his wife attended the ceremony of the laying of the foundation stone.

Decline, death, and succession 
In 1862 Londonderry was diagnosed as mentally ill. He was secluded in a mental institution at White Rock Pavilion in Hastings. He died there on 25 November 1872, aged 67 and was buried in the Newtownards Priory. His wife, the dowager Marchioness of Londonderry died on 2 September 1884, aged 70, and was buried with him in the double grave in the priory.

As he had no legitimate children, he was succeeded in the marquessate by his half-brother, George Vane-Tempest, 2nd Earl Vane. This had the effect that the fortunes of the Stewart and the Vane side of the Londonderry family were reunited in a single hand.

Ancestry

Notes and references

Notes

Citations

Sources 

  – (for his coat of arms)
  – (for Londonderry)
  – L to M (for Londonderry)

External links 

1805 births
1872 deaths
Frederick Stewart
Knights of St Patrick
Lord-Lieutenants of Down
Lords of the Admiralty
4
Castlereagh, Frederick Stewart, Viscount
Members of the Privy Council of the United Kingdom
People educated at Eton College
Castlereagh, Frederick Stewart, Viscount
Castlereagh, Frederick Stewart, Viscount
Castlereagh, Frederick Stewart, Viscount
Castlereagh, Frederick Stewart, Viscount
Castlereagh, Frederick Stewart, Viscount
Castlereagh, Frederick Stewart, Viscount
Castlereagh, Frederick Stewart, Viscount
Castlereagh, Frederick Stewart, Viscount
Londonderry, M4
Frederick